Osceola Guy Lacy (June 12, 1897 in Cleveland, Tennessee – November 19, 1953) was a second baseman in  Major League Baseball. He played for the 1926 Cleveland Indians.

He was a manager in the minor leagues from 1926 to 1941, winning league championships in 1931, 1934 and 1940.

External links 

1897 births
1953 deaths
Major League Baseball second basemen
Cleveland Indians players
Minor league baseball managers
Allentown Dukes players
Americus Cardinals players
Anniston Moulders players
Bridgeport Bears (baseball) players
Charlotte Hornets (baseball) players
Chattanooga Lookouts players
Columbia Comers players
Greenville Spinners players
Jackson Senators players
Jackson Mississippians players
Jacksonville Tars players
Lynchburg Senators players
Mount Airy Graniteers players
Newark Bears (IL) players
New Haven Indians players
Portsmouth Truckers players
Richmond Colts players
Sanford Lookouts players
Baseball players from Tennessee
People from Cleveland, Tennessee
Tifton Tilters players